This is a list of all cemeteries and memorials erected following the Battle of Gallipoli in 1915 during World War I. There is one French cemetery, 31 Commonwealth War Graves Commission cemeteries containing mainly dead from Britain, Australia, New Zealand, India and Newfoundland, and over 50 memorials, grave sites and cemeteries dedicated to the Turkish casualties.

Helles

Cemeteries

 Allied
 French War Cemetery
 Lancashire Landing Cemetery
 Pink Farm Cemetery
 Redoubt Cemetery
 Skew Bridge Cemetery
 Twelve Tree Copse Cemetery
 V Beach Cemetery
 Turkish
 Alçıtepe Mass Grave
 Seddülbahir Ammunition Dump’s Cemetery (mass grave)
 Onion Valley Turkish War Cemetery

There is only one solitary marked Allied grave outside of a cemetery on the peninsula resulting from the campaign, that of Lieutenant Colonel Charles Doughty-Wylie.  He was buried close to where he was killed during the capture of Seddülbahir on the morning of April 26, 1915.

There are several isolated Turkish graves, those of Soldier Halil Ibrahim, Lt-Colonel Hasan and 2nd Lieutenant Mustafa.

Memorials

 Allied
 Cape Helles Memorial to the Missing – Britain and the British Commonwealth (except New Zealand).
 France – French War Cemetery Memorial, Morto Bay – France
 The New Zealand Memorials to the Missing in Hill 60 Cemetery, Lone Pine Cemetery, Twelve Tree Copse Cemetery and on Chunuk Bair.
 The memorial to Eric Duckworth in Redoubt Cemetery is unique in the peninsula as a private memorial within a CWGC cemetery
 Turkish
 Çanakkale Martyrs' Memorial
 18 March 1915 Memorial
 Alçıtepe Garrison War Memorial
 First Martyrs Memorial
 Gully Ravine Nuri Yamut Memorial
 Gully Ravine Field Dressing Post Memorial & Cemetery
 Gully Ravine Turkish Soldiers Memorial
 Last Arrow Memorial
 Marshal Fevzi Çakmak's War Memorial
 Sergeant Yahya Memorial

Anzac

Cemeteries

 Allied
 4th Battalion Parade Ground Cemetery
 7th Field Ambulance Cemetery
 Ari Burnu Cemetery
 Baby 700 Cemetery
 Beach Cemetery
 Canterbury Cemetery
 Chunuk Bair Cemetery
 Courtney's and Steel's Post Cemetery
 Embarkation Pier Cemetery
 Hill 60 Cemetery
 Johnston's Jolly Cemetery
 Lone Pine Cemetery
 No. 2 Outpost Cemetery
 New Zealand No. 2 Outpost Cemetery
 Plugge's Plateau Cemetery
 Quinn's Post Cemetery
 Shell Green Cemetery
 Shrapnel Valley Cemetery
 The Farm Cemetery
 The Nek Cemetery
 Walker's Ridge Cemetery
 Turkish
 Karayörük Valley Cemetery
 57th Infantry Regiment Memorial
 Kesikdere Cemetery
 Çataldere Cemetery
 Kocadere Hospital Memorial and Cemetery

There are also isolated Turkish graves belonging to Lt-Colonel Hussein Manastir, Captain Mehmet and First Lt Nazif Çakmak.

Memorials

 Allied
 Chunuk Bair – New Zealand
 Lone Pine Memorial – Australia and New Zealand
 Hill 60 – New Zealand
 Turkish
 Sergeant Mehmet’s Memorial
 Chunuk Bair Soldiers’ Memorial
 Chunuk Bair Atatürk Memorial
 Scrubby Knoll Turkish War Memorial
 Turkish War Memorial at The Nek
 Kabatepe (Gaba Tepe) Info Centre & Memorials
 27th Regiments' Queensland Point Memorial
 Ari Burnu Memorial
 Damakçilik Bair Memorial
 Lone Pine Memorial (Turkish)
 Respect to Turkish Soldiers Memorial
 Respect to Enemy Soldier’s Memorial
 Chunuk Bair Unknown Soldiers' Memorial & Grave

Suvla

Cemeteries

 Allied
 Azmak Cemetery
 Green Hill Cemetery
 Hill 10 Cemetery
 Lala Baba Cemetery
 Turkish
 1st Lt Halid & 2 Lt Ali Riza’s Graves
 1st Lt Hasan Tahsin & Regtl Mufti’s Graves
 Kireçtepe Gendarmes Cemetery
 Lt Colonel Halit & Ziya’s Graves
 Pine Monastery Cemetery

There is also a single isolated marked Turkish grave, belonging to a German nurse, Erica Ragip, the wife of a medical officer, who was killed by a howitzer shell.

Memorials
 Allied
 Gallipoli Newfoundland Memorial
 Turkish
 Scimitar Hill Memorial
 Suvla Point Memorial
 Kireçtepe Memorial

European bank of the Dardanelles
 Turkish
 Kilitbahir Castle (Fort)
 Akbas Cemetery and Memorial
 National Park Main Information Centre Memorials
 A Captain’s Grave
 Çamburnu Martyr’s Memorial
 An Artillery Captain’s Grave
 Captain Tahir’s Memorial
 "Stop Traveller" Memorial
 Corporal Seyit’s Statue
 Mecidiye Cemetery and Memorial
 Havuzlar Cemetery and Memorial

Asian bank of the Dardanelles
These are included for completeness, although they are located just across the Dardanelles from the peninsula. They also commemorate aspects of the Gallipoli Campaign.
 Turkish
 Hasan-Mevsuf Battery Cemetery
 Kumkale Plain Intepe Battery Cemetery
 Replica of the minelayer Nusret

Footnotes

References 
 
 Commonwealth War Graves Commission, Memorial Register 6; The Lone Pine Memorial Gallipoli (Part 4: New Zealand). CWGC, Maidenhead UK, 1990.
Gallipoli: A Battlefield Guide, Phil Taylor & Pam Cupper, 2000,

External links 
 Gallipoli guide with photographs
  Another complete list of cemeteries, memorials and relics in Gallipoli

Gallipoli Peninsula
Gallipoli Peninsula
.Gallipoli Peninsula
.Gallipoli Peninsula
.Gallipoli Peninsula
Cemeteries
Cemeteries
Gallipoli Peninsula
Gallipoli Peninsula
Gallipoli Peninsula
World War I memorials